Mount Adam Joachim is a mountain four kilometres ENE of Gong Lake in Canada's Jasper National Park. It was named in 1968 by J. Monroe Thorington after Adam Joachim. Joachim, a partial Cree Indian, was a horse packer who accompanied Alfred J. Ostheimer on his 1927 expedition into the Columbia Icefield.

References

Three-thousanders of Alberta
Winston Churchill Range
Mountains of Jasper National Park